Hadi Ahmed Basheer (born November 1, 1951) is an Iraqi football coach and former player. He played as a midfielder and spent the majority of his career with Al-Minaa club.

He was capped Iraqi League title for Al-Mina'a in 1978, and appeared at the World Military Cup 1977, He played matches in Pestabola Merdeka 1977 in Malaysia. Hadi play in the Moscow Olympics in 1980, where his goal was the debut Iraqi goal in Olympic competition, against Costa Rica; sports fans called him: the (Maestro of Iraqi football). He played in 5th Arabian Gulf Cup in 1979 and scored two goals, the first goal against Emirates, and the second against Kuwait, and won the best player title of the tournament. He took part in the three seasons of the tournament (1976, 1979 and 1982) and scored the goal of No. 200 in the tournament's history.

Hadi's older brother, Abdul Razzaq, was playing with him in Al-Mina'a (captain), Hadi has influenced his style.

International career
On April 2, 1975 Hadi Ahmed played his debut with Iraq against Qatar in a fully international match, in the 1976 AFC Asian Cup qualification in Baghdad, which ended 1-0 for Iraq.

On March 26, 1982 Hadi Ahmed played his last international match with Iraq against Qatar, within the 6th Arabian Gulf Cup in UAE, which ended 2-1 for Iraq.

International goals
Scores and results list Iraq's goal tally first.

Honors

Local
Al-Mina'a
 1978 Iraqi League: Champion

International
Iraq
 1977 World Men's Military Cup: Champion
 1977 Pestabola Merdeka: runner-up
 1979 Arabian Gulf Cup: Champion
 1981 Pestabola Merdeka: Champion

References

External links
 
 
 
 Al-Minaa Club: Sailors of south

1951 births
Living people
Association football midfielders
Iraqi footballers
Al-Mina'a SC players
Sportspeople from Basra
Iraq international footballers
1976 AFC Asian Cup players
Olympic footballers of Iraq
Footballers at the 1980 Summer Olympics
Iraqi football managers
Al-Mina'a SC managers
Al-Ahli Club Manama managers
Expatriate football managers in Bahrain